The following is the list of football players selected for the 1998 European under-18 championship played in Cyprus.

Each national team submitted a squad of 18 players, two of whom had to be goalkeepers.

Ages are correct as of the start of the tournament, 19 July 1998. Players in bold have later been capped at full international level.

Group A

Germany

Head coach: Rainer Bonhof

Lithuania

Head coach: Vytautas Stanevičius

Portugal

Head coach: Agostinho Oliveira

Spain

Head coach: Iñaki Sáez

Group B

Croatia
Head coach: Martin Novoselac

Cyprus

Head coach: Chrysostomos Iakovou

England

Head coach: Howard Wilkinson

Republic of Ireland

Head coach: Brian Kerr

References

UEFA European Under-19 Championship squads